Courthouse Falls is a waterfall in Western North Carolina, located near Balsam Grove.

Geology
Courthouse Creek flows through the Pisgah National Forest near a mountain called the Devil's Courthouse then through a narrow chute into a natural amphitheater of bedrock.

Visiting
The falls are accessible to the general public on a trail of moderate difficulty.  To reach the falls, either go down NC Highway 215 for 6.5 miles south from the Blue Ridge Parkway and turn left onto Forest Road 140 (Courthouse Creek Road).  Go 3 miles down the road and park on the right just after crossing the bridge over Courthouse Creek.  Follow the marked trail for .36 miles to the falls, which will be on the left.

Nearby falls
About 1.4 miles from NC 215 on Forest Road 140, on the way to Courthouse Falls, is a 200' high waterfall on a side stream of the North Fork French Broad River.

Upper Courthouse Falls is another waterfall a half mile upstream on Courthouse Creek.  The trail is overgrown and the falls are difficult to reach.  About 3/4 mile upstream from that is another falls also referred to as Upper Courthouse Falls. 

Other falls in the region include:
Chestnut Falls
Kiesee Falls
Dill Falls
French Broad and Mill Shoals Falls
Bird Rock Falls
Eastatoe Falls

References

External links 
 North Carolina Waterfalls - Courthouse Falls
 Video Overview of Courthouse Falls

Protected areas of Transylvania County, North Carolina
Waterfalls of North Carolina
Pisgah National Forest
Waterfalls of Transylvania County, North Carolina